was a Japanese freestyle swimmer. He was part of the Japanese teams that won Olympic medals in 1960 and 1964, and set three world records in the 4 × 200 m freestyle relay in 1959 and 1963. At the 1960 Olympics Fukui also reached the final of the individual 400 m event. He was the flag bearer for Japan at the 1964 Olympics.

References

1940 births
1992 deaths
Olympic swimmers of Japan
Olympic silver medalists for Japan
Olympic bronze medalists for Japan
Swimmers at the 1960 Summer Olympics
Swimmers at the 1964 Summer Olympics
World record setters in swimming
Olympic bronze medalists in swimming
Japanese male freestyle swimmers
Asian Games medalists in swimming
Swimmers at the 1958 Asian Games
Medalists at the 1964 Summer Olympics
Medalists at the 1960 Summer Olympics
Asian Games gold medalists for Japan
Olympic silver medalists in swimming
Medalists at the 1958 Asian Games
Universiade medalists in swimming
Universiade silver medalists for Japan
Universiade bronze medalists for Japan
Medalists at the 1963 Summer Universiade
20th-century Japanese people